This article gives statistics for lunar eclipses grouped by century. Detailed information about tetrads, timing, and other facts can be found at the linked references.

General statistics
In the 5,000 years from 2000 BC to 3000 AD, there will be a total of 12,064 lunar eclipses:
4,378 penumbral eclipses, of which 4,237 were partial and 141 were total
4,207 partial eclipses
3,479 total eclipses, of which 2,074 were central and 1,405 were non-central

The longest partial lunar eclipse during this period will occur on 8 February 2669, lasting 3:30:02. The longest total eclipse occurred on 31 May 318, with a duration of 01:46:36.

Lunar eclipses by century

See also
Historically significant lunar eclipses

References

Century